Vincent Onyala (born 10 December 1996) is a Kenyan rugby sevens player. He competed in the men's tournament at the 2020 Summer Olympics.

Onyala was named the most valuable player of the 2019 Kenya National Sevens Circuit. He representd Kenya at the 2022 Rugby World Cup Sevens in Cape Town.

References

External links
 

1996 births
Living people
Male rugby sevens players
Olympic rugby sevens players of Kenya
Rugby sevens players at the 2020 Summer Olympics
Place of birth missing (living people)
Rugby sevens players at the 2022 Commonwealth Games